Qaderabad-e Murtan (also Romanized as Qāderābād-e Mūrtān; also known as Ghader Abad, Kādarābād, and Qāderābād) is a village in Damen Rural District, in the Central District of Iranshahr County, Sistan and Baluchestan Province, Iran. At the 2006 census, its population was 717, in 149 families.

References 

Populated places in Iranshahr County